The Chaotic Wrestling (CW) Tag Team Championship is a professional wrestling tag team championship in American independent promotion Chaotic Wrestling. It was first won by The Damned (Mad Dog and Draven), who defeated Derik Destiny and Kid Krazy in Worcester, Massachusetts, on September 17, 2000. There have been 56 official reigns.

Title history

Combined reigns

By team

By wrestler

See also
Chaotic Wrestling Heavyweight Championship
Chaotic Wrestling New England Championship
Chaotic Wrestling Pan Optic Championship

References

External links
 Chaotic Wrestling Tag Team Title History at Cagematch.net

Chaotic Wrestling championships
Tag team wrestling championships